Mather House may refer to:

 Mather House (Case Western Reserve University), classroom building
 Mather House (Convent, Louisiana), 1811 home
 Mather House (Harvard University), residence
 Call House, also known as the Henry R. and Mary Hewitt Mather House, Marquette, Michigan
 Mather House Museum, Port Jefferson, New York
 Mather-Kirkland House, Austin, Texas, listed on the NRHP in Travis County, Texas
 Stephen Tyng Mather Home, also known as Mather House or Mather Homestead, Darien, Connecticut

See also
Mather Estate House, Perrysburg, Ohio, designed by Mills, Rhines, Bellman & Nordhoff
Mather Homestead (Hartford, Connecticut), listed on the NRHP in Hartford, Connecticut
Mather Inn, Ishpeming, Michigan
William Mathers House, Carlisle, Kentucky, listed on the NRHP in Nicholas County, Kentucky